Ginevra di Scozia is an opera in two acts by Simon Mayr set to an Italian libretto by Gaetano Rossi based on Antonio Salvi's Ginevra, principessa di Scozia, which in turn was adapted from cantos 5 and 6 of Ludovico Ariosto's Orlando Furioso. Ginevra di Scozia premiered on 21 April 1801 at the Regio Teatro Nuovo in Trieste to celebrate the inauguration of the new theatre. The story is virtually identical to that of Handel's Ariodante which shares the same source for the libretto.

Roles

Recordings
Mayr: Ginevra di Scozia – Live recording to celebrate the 200th anniversary of the opera's premiere. Tiziano Severini conducts the orchestra and chorus of the Teatro Lirico "Giuseppe Verdi", with Elizabeth Vidal as Ginevra and Daniela Barcellona as Ariodante. Label: Opera Rara ORC 23
Mayr: Ginevra di Scozia – Live recording. George Petrou, conductor, Münchner Rundfunkorchester with  Myrtò Papatanasiu, Anna Bonitatibus, Mario Zeffiri. Label : Oehms Classics OC 960

References
Notes

Further reading

External links
 
 Libretto (in Italian)

Operas by Simon Mayr
Italian-language operas
1801 operas
Operas
Operas set in Scotland
Operas based on works by Ludovico Ariosto
Libretti by Gaetano Rossi